Pachydota peruviana is a moth of the family Erebidae. It was described by Walter Rothschild in 1909. It is found in Peru and Colombia.

Subspecies
Pachydota peruviana peruviana (Peru)
Pachydota peruviana palmeri Rothschild, 1910 (Colombia)

References

Phaegopterina
Moths described in 1909